Joseph Elsberry McWilliams (1904 – 1996) was an American right-wing political figure of the 1940s, and the principal defendant in the federal Smith Act sedition trial of 1944.

Biography

McWilliams was born in 1904 to a poor pioneer family in Hitchcock, Oklahoma.  In his earlier days McWilliams was well known for using an American-flag-draped covered Conestoga wagon for publicizing his rallies and speeches, as well as for drawing attention to his cause. Most of his early rallies were impromptu street presentations that at times ended violently, as one did on July 4, 1940 in New York City. A crowd which had supported McWilliams turned ugly when McWilliams began to disparage Jews, Communists and businessmen for the world's problems, and McWilliams was arrested. McWilliams used the arrest to further his cause through newspaper reports of his speech and the violence that resulted.

In 1939, he led a group called Christian Mobilizers that splintered from the Christian Front founded by Charles Coughlin. McWilliams supported an escalation on the violence against Jews and communists and also supported cooperation with the German American Bund. 

In 1940, he ran for Congress as a Republican in the 18th Congressional District of New York, which is around the Yorkville section of Manhattan. After losing by a large margin, he ran for Congress under the American Destiny Party, a political organization he'd founded and based on the Nazi Party.  McWilliams was disqualified from the ballot after failing to gather enough signatures.

In 1944, McWilliams was identified as the main defendant in the government prosecution of 30 suspected conspirators and sympathizers under the Smith Act.  The 30 were widely varied, including the anti-Capitalist Fascist Lawrence Dennis.  After seven months U.S. District Court Judge Edward C. Eicher died of a heart attack, causing a mistrial. After the war ended, the government chose not to pursue the case.

After World War II, he briefly worked on the campaign of North Carolina Democratic Senator Robert Rice Reynolds, who had been a fascist sympathizer.

McWilliams died in 1996.

References

External links
Christian Affronters Time Magazine, November 27, 1939.
Mr. McNazi Time Magazine, September 23, 1940.
The Curtain Rise Time Magazine, May 1, 1944.

1904 births
1996 deaths
20th-century American engineers
20th-century American inventors
American fascists
American political consultants
New York (state) Republicans
Old Right (United States)
People from Blaine County, Oklahoma
American anti-communists
Activists from New York City
20th-century far-right politicians in the United States